Diego Parini (born 16 January 1998) is an Argentine professional footballer who plays as a left midfielder for Vidago FC.

Career
Parini started his career with Gimnasia y Esgrima, having signed in 2006. He initially saw a first-team teamsheet in July 2018, when manager Pedro Troglio selected the midfielder on the bench for Copa Argentina ties with Sportivo Belgrano and Olimpo; but went unused both times. His professional debut came four months following, with Parini being chosen to start a 3–1 loss to River Plate on 2 December 2018. He didn't appear again in 2018–19, and would depart in June 2019. Parini soon joined Campeonato de Portugal side AD Oliveirense. He was immediately loaned to GD Mirandês of the Bragança FA Division of Honour.

For Mirandês, after months of being ineligible due to registration issues, Parini made his debut on 12 January 2020 against Vila Flor SC. His first goal arrived during his second appearance seven days later versus FC Vinhais, after converting a penalty in an 8–1 away victory. In his third match, Parini scored a brace in a fixture with GD Sendim. Later that year, on 18 August, Parini was signed by Campeonato de Portugal team Vidago FC. He received his first senior red card during a draw with Maria da Fonte on 25 October. Parini scored his first Vidago goal on 15 November in a home loss to Vianense.

Career statistics
.

References

External links

1998 births
Living people
Footballers from La Plata
Argentine footballers
Association football midfielders
Argentine expatriate footballers
Expatriate footballers in Portugal
Argentine expatriate sportspeople in Portugal
Argentine Primera División players
Campeonato de Portugal (league) players
Club de Gimnasia y Esgrima La Plata footballers
AD Oliveirense players